The Greenland Telescope is a radio telescope that is currently installed and operating at the Thule Air Base in north-western Greenland. It will later be deployed at the Summit Station research camp, located at the highest point of the Greenland ice sheet at an altitude of 3,210 meters (10,530 feet).

The telescope is an international collaboration between:

 The Academia Sinica Institute of Astronomy and Astrophysics (Taiwan) (project leaders)
 The Smithsonian Astrophysical Observatory of the Center for Astrophysics  Harvard & Smithsonian (United States)
 The National Radio Astronomy Observatory (United States)
 The Haystack Observatory of the Massachusetts Institute of Technology (United States)

In 2011 the U.S. National Science Foundation gave the Smithsonian Astrophysical Observatory a 12-meter radio antenna that had been used as a prototype for the ALMA project in Chile. The antenna was to be deployed in Greenland. Deploying the telescope in the middle of Greenland is ideal for detecting certain radio frequencies. 

The telescope will be used to study the event horizons of black holes and to test how general relativity behaves in environments with extreme gravity. 

The Greenland Telescope will become part of the global network of telescopes that makes up the Event Horizon Telescope that will study supermassive black holes and explore the origin of the relativistic jet in the active galaxy Messier 87.

Progress and current status 

Between 2013 and 2015, the Taiwanese Academia Sinica Institute of Astronomy and Astrophysics modified the telescope so that it would better work in the cold environment of the Arctic. The telescope was shipped to Greenland in July 2016 and re-assembled in July 2017 at the Thule Air Base in north-western Greenland. The telescope took its first image on 25th of December 2017. 

The telescope will be deployed at the Summit Station research camp, located at the highest point of the Greenland ice sheet.

References

Additional sources
Hirashita, Hiroyuki; Koch, Patrick M.; Matsushita, Satoki; Takakuwa, Shigehisa; Nakamura, Masanori; Asada, Keiichi; Liu, Hauyu Baobab; Urata, Yuji; Wang, Ming-Jye; Wang, Wei-Hao; Takahashi, Satoko; Tang, Ya-Wen; Chang, Hsian-Hong; Huang, Kuiyun; Morata, Oscar; Otsuka, Masaaki; Lin, Kai-Yang; Tsai, An-Li; Lin, Yen-Ting; Srinivasan, Sundar; Martin-Cocher, Pierre; Pu, Hung-Yi; Kemper, Francisca; Patel, Nimesh; Grimes, Paul; Huang, Yau-De; Han, Chih-Chiang; Huang, Yen-Ru; Nishioka, Hiroaki; Lin, Lupin Chun-Che; Zhang, Qizhou; Keto, Eric; Burgos, Roberto; Chen, Ming-Tang; Inoue, Makoto; Ho, Paul T. P.. "First-generation science cases for ground-based terahertz telescopes". Publications of the Astronomical Society of Japan,  2016: Volume 68, Issue 1, id.R1 pp. |doi=10.1093/pasj/psv115
 The M87 Workshop: Towards the 100th Anniversary of the Discovery of Cosmic Jets
 
 Arctic Greenland Telescope Opens New Era of Astronomy SpaceRef, 2018-05-31.

Telescopes
Radio observatories
Astronomy in Taiwan
Interferometric telescopes
Radio telescopes
Astronomical imaging
Astronomical instruments